Simona Monyová (17 March 1967 – 3 August 2011) was a Czech novelist.
She wrote more than 20 books and was a bestselling author in the Czech Republic.
On 3 August 2011 she was found dead in her house. The police suspected her husband, Boris Ingr, was the murderer, as there was a history of domestic abuse. He was later convicted and sentenced to 15 years in prison. The sentence was upheld by the Supreme Court in 2013.

References

External links 
 Website of Simona Monyová

1967 births
2011 deaths
Czech novelists
Czech women writers
Writers from Brno
People murdered in the Czech Republic
20th-century novelists
20th-century women writers
2010s murders in the Czech Republic
2011 crimes in the Czech Republic
2011 murders in Europe